The Entity List is a trade restriction list published by the United States Department of Commerce's Bureau of Industry and Security (BIS), consisting of certain foreign persons, entities, or governments. Entities on the Entity List are subject to U.S. license requirements for the export or transfer of specified items, such as some U.S. technologies. However, U.S. persons or companies are not prohibited from purchasing items from a company on the Entity List. Being included on the Entities List is less severe than being designated a "Denied Person" and more severe than being placed on the Unverified List (UVL). 

First published in 1997 to inform the public on entities involved in disseminating weapons of mass destruction, the list has since expanded to include entities that engaged in "activities sanctioned by the State Department and activities contrary to U.S. national security and/or foreign policy interests." It is published by the BIS at Supplement No. 4 to Part 744 of the Export Administration Regulations (EAR).

Listed entities 
The Entity List includes companies and organizations based in multiple countries, including: China, Venezuela, Russia, Switzerland, Germany, Taiwan, Japan, Myanmar, Singapore, Canada, Iran, Lebanon, Netherlands, Pakistan, South Korea, Turkey, United Arab Emirates, United Kingdom and Israel.

China 

According to the Bureau of Industry and Security, there are approximately 600 Chinese entities on the Entity List. Designated entities consist of mainly companies and research institutions (including universities like Harbin Institute of Technology) involved in military technology, 5G, AI, and other advanced technologies. Dozens of Chinese entities participating in China's military-civil fusion or the alleged human rights abuses in Xinjiang province are on the list, including companies that make surveillance gear and those that helped the Chinese military to construct artificial islands in the South China Sea.

Huawei 
Notable entities on the Entity List include Huawei, a Chinese telecommunications and consumer electronics manufacturer. Huawei was added to the list in May 2019, with a revision in May 2020 that further tightened sanctions, resulting in it no longer being able to use certain Android software on its smartphones. While Google services are banned in mainland China, consumers outside mainland China are accustomed to Google services, and Huawei's smartphone market share declined as a result.

History 
In May 2019, Chinese technology company Huawei was listed (sanctions against Huawei were further tightened in May 2020).

In August 2020, 5 Russian governmental facilities were listed for participating in Russia's chemical and biological weapons programs.

In March 2021, the Biden administration added 14 entities (based in Russia, Switzerland and Germany) to the list for aiding Russia's weapons of mass destruction programs and chemical weapons activities; the listing of the 14 entities followed the addition of 5 Russian governmental facilities to the list in August 2020 for on the same grounds.

In March 2021, the Biden administration also announced restrictions on entities in Myanmar in response to the military coup in the country.

In November 2021, Israeli technology companies NSO Group and Candiru were added for supplying spyware to foreign governments that used it to "maliciously target government officials, journalists, businesspeople, activists, academics, and embassy workers", with Positive Technologies (Russia), and Computer Security Initiative Consultancy PTE LTD (Singapore) also listed concurrently on similar grounds.

Chinese responses

Huawei's response and stockpiling 
Before the September 15, 2020 deadline, Huawei was in "survival mode" and stockpiled "5G mobile processors, Wifi, radio frequency and display driver chips and other components" from key chip suppliers and manufacturers, including Samsung, SK Hynix, TSMC, MediaTek, Realtek, Novatek, and RichWave. Even in 2019, Huawei spent $23.45 billion on the stockpiling of chips and other supplies in 2019, up 73% from 2018.

On its most crucial business, namely, its telecoms business (including 5G) and server business, Huawei has stockpiled 1.5 to 2 years' worth of chips and components. It began massively stockpiling from 2018, when Meng Wanzhou, the daughter of Huawei's founder, was arrested in Canada upon U.S. request. Key Huawei suppliers included Xilinx, Intel, AMD, Samsung, SK Hynix, Micron and Kioxia. On the other hand, analysts predicted that Huawei could ship 195 million units of smartphones from its existing stockpile in 2021, but shipments may drop to 50 million in 2021 if rules are not relaxed.

China's Unreliable Entities List 
In response to the Entity List, the Chinese government announced in May 2019 that it would establish an "unreliable entities" list. On the list are foreign companies, organizations or persons which has "severely damaged the legitimate interests of Chinese firms by not obeying market rules, violating contracts or blocking or cutting off supply for non-commercial reasons."

In June 2019, multiple ministries of the Chinese government summoned the representatives of technology companies, including Microsoft, Dell, and Samsung, to warn of dire consequences if they cooperated with the U.S. ban on sales of key American technology to Chinese companies. In the meeting, China also emphasized its commitment to open trade and the protection of intellectual property.

The Chinese list was created and went into immediate effect in September 2020, after the Trump administration decided to ban Chinese apps TikTok and WeChat from American app stores. Chinese media has previously identified Apple, Qualcomm, Cisco, and Boeing as U.S. firms that could be targets of the list.

See also 

 Export Control Act
 Specially Designated Nationals and Blocked Persons List

References

External links 
 

Economic history of the United States
Geopolitical rivalry
Trade wars
United States sanctions
United States Department of Commerce
Export and import control